Hatun Chhuka (Quechua hatun big, chhuka angle, "big angle", Hispanicized spelling Hatunchuca) is a mountain in the Andes of Peru, about  high. It is located in the Cusco Region, Espinar Province, Ocoruro District. It lies north of Atawallpa.

References

Mountains of Peru
Mountains of Cusco Region